Georissa laseroni is a species of minute cave snails that have an operculum, gastropod mollusks in the family Hydrocenidae.This species is endemic to Australia.

References

Hydrocenidae
Gastropods of Australia
Vulnerable fauna of Australia
Taxonomy articles created by Polbot